Isador Mitchell Sheffer (October 15, 1901–April 20, 1992) was an American mathematician best known for the Sheffer sequence of polynomials. Born in Massachusetts, he lived a large portion of his life in State College, Pennsylvania, where he was a Professor of Mathematics at Pennsylvania State University.

He received his PhD from Harvard University in 1927, under the direction of George Birkhoff.

References

20th-century American mathematicians
1901 births
1992 deaths
Harvard University alumni
Pennsylvania State University people